Handsell, also known as the Webb House, is a historic home located at Vienna, Dorchester County, Maryland, United States. It is a late-18th-century Georgian-style manor house. It is a -story brick structure over an English basement.  The main facade is five bays wide and has a central entrance containing a double door flanked by windows.  Handsell bears the name of a 1665 land grant, which has been in the Webb family since 1892.

Handsell was listed on the National Register of Historic Places in 2008.

References

External links
, at Maryland Historical Trust
 Handsell, 4835 Indiantown Road, Vienna, Dorchester County, MD: 21 photos, 6 measured drawings, 23 data pages, and 2 photo caption pages at Historic American Buildings Survey

Houses completed in 1770
Houses in Dorchester County, Maryland
Houses on the National Register of Historic Places in Maryland
Georgian architecture in Maryland
National Register of Historic Places in Dorchester County, Maryland
1770 establishments in Maryland